The surname Smith, as a taxonomic authority, may refer to any of a number of people across a variety of disciplines. Determining which person is intended generally requires looking at initials in addition to the surname, and in some cases to the field and dates for which the authority is cited.

Generally
 Andrew Smith (zoologist) (A. Smith, 1797–1872), a Scottish surgeon, naturalist, explorer and zoologist
 C. Lavett Smith
 Edgar Albert Smith (E. A. Smith, 1847–1916), zoologist and malacologist. See also other malacologists named Smith
 Erwin Frink Smith (1854–1927), a bacteriologist
 Hobart Muir Smith (H. M. Smith, 1912–2013), an American herpetologist
 Hugh McCormick Smith (1865–1941), an American ichthyologist
 James Leonard Brierley Smith (Smith, JLB, 1897–1968), a South African ichthyologist
 Jane E. Smith, a dipterist
 John Bernhardt Smith (1858–1912), an American entomologist
 Malcolm Arthur Smith (1875–1958), a British herpetologist
 Rosemary Margaret Smith (1933–2004), a Scottish botanist
 Sidney Irving Smith (1843–1926), an American malacologist
 William Leo Smith

 Mycologists and lichenologists
 A.M. Smith (taxonomic authority) (A.M.Sm.bis)
 Alexander Hanchett Smith (A.H.Sm., 1904–1986), an American mycologist
 Annie Lorrain Smith (A.L.Sm., 1854–1937), a British lichenologist
 Brendan J. Smith (B.J.Sm.)
 Charles Leonard Smith (C.L.Sm.)
 Clayton Orville Smith (C.O.Sm.)
 Clifford W. Smith (C.W.Sm., born 1938), a lichenologist and botanist
 Donald J. Smith (D.J.Sm.)
 Elizabeth Hight Smith (E.H.Sm.)
 Erwin Frink Smith (E.F.Sm., 1854–1927), a bacteriologist
 F.E.V. Smith (F.E.V.Sm.)
 G.S. Smith (G.S.Sm.)
 Gavin J.D. Smith (G.J.D.Sm.)
 George Smith (mycologist) (G.Sm., 1895–1967), a mycologist
 Helen Vandervort Smith (H.V.Sm.)
 Hendrik Smith (H.Sm.ter)
 J.M.B. Smith (J.M.B.Sm.)
 James Edward Smith (Sm., 1759–1828), an English botanist and founder of the Linnean Society
 Jeffery Drew Smith (J.D.Sm.)
 John Smith (botanist) (J.Sm. Dalry, 1798–1888), a botanist
 Kenneth Manley Smith (K.M.Sm.)
 Marion Ashton Smith (M.A.Sm.)
 Matthew E. Smith (M.E.Sm.)
 Maudy Th. Smith (M.T.Sm.)
 Paul Hamilton Smith (P.H.Sm.)
 Peter R. Smith (P.R.Sm.)
 R.B. Smith (taxonomic authority) (R.B.Sm.)
 R.J. Smith (R.J.Sm.)
 Ralph Elliott Smith (Eliot) (R.E.Sm.)
 Ronald I. Lewis Smith (R.I.L.Sm.)
 Selena Y. Smith (S.Y.Sm.), a botanist
 Stanley Jay Smith (S.J.Sm.)
 William Gardner Smith (Wm.G.Sm.)
 Worthington George Smith (W.G.Sm., 1835–1917), an English cartoonist and illustrator, archaeologist, plant pathologist and mycologist

References

  – "Smith"

See also
 Smith (surname)
 :Category: Taxonomists

Smith
taxonomy authority, Smith
Smith, Taxonomic authorities